Tuyo is a bolero written and composed by Brazilian singer-songwriter Rodrigo Amarante for Narcos opening theme.  Amarante wrote and vocalized the Spanish-language song, "Tuyo" ("Yours"), as the opening theme for the Netflix Original series Narcos. He was inspired by the thought of what kind of music Pablo Escobar's mother would have listened to when raising her son. The song debuted at No. 6 on the Latin Pop Digital Songs around the 2015 series premiere and was nominated for a Primetime Emmy Award for Outstanding Main Title Theme Music.

Charts

References

External links
 
 
 

Songs written by Rodrigo Amarante
Narcos
2015 songs
2015 singles
Spanish-language songs
Television drama theme songs